Legs Eleven is the fourth studio album by drummer Chad Wackerman, released in 2004 through the Australia Council for the Arts.

Track listing

Personnel
Chad Wackerman – drums, percussion
James Muller – guitar
Daryl Pratt – synthesizer, vibraphone, marimba
Leon Gaer – bass
Guy Dickerson – engineering, mixing
Don Bartley – mastering

References

Chad Wackerman albums
2004 albums